Ack Ack may refer to:
 Anti-aircraft warfare
 Ack Ack (horse), American Hall of Fame racehorse
 Ack Ack Handicap (Churchill Downs), a horse race held at Churchill Downs named for the racehorse
 Ack Ack Handicap (Hollywood Park), a former horse race held at Hollywood Park named for the racehorse
 Andrew Haldane, nicknamed "Ack-Ack", captain in the US Marine Corps during World War II